"She Makes My Day" is a song by British vocalist Robert Palmer, which was released in 1988 as the third single from his ninth studio album Heavy Nova. The song was written and produced by Palmer. "She Makes My Day" reached No. 6 in both the UK and Ireland.

In Michael Luckman's book Alien Rock: The Rock 'n' Roll Extraterrestrial Connection, Palmer said of writing the track, "I didn't give much thought to it at all. It was like automatic writing."

Release
"She Makes My Day" was released by EMI on 7" vinyl in the UK, Europe, Australia and the US. A 12" vinyl version was released in the UK and Spain, while a CD edition was also issued in the UK and Japan. All editions featured the B-side "Disturbing Behaviour", except the US and Japanese releases. The US release featured "Casting a Spell" as the B-side, and "Change His Ways" for the Japanese release. All three B-sides appeared on Heavy Nova.

Promotion
A music video was filmed to promote the single. It received medium rotation on MTV.

Critical reception
Upon release, Billboard listed the song as a recommended single under the "Pop" category and described it as a "lilting, easy-paced rock ballad". James Masterton, in his 2015 book The Top 40 Annual 1988, described the song as a "smouldering Sinatra-esque slow jazz single". In a retrospective review of Heavy Nova, Terry Staunton of Record Collector felt the song was an "intricately layered ballad" and "arguably the sweetest few minutes in his entire catalogue".

Track listing
7" single
"She Makes My Day" - 4:21
"Disturbing Behaviour" - 3:43

7" single (US release)
"She Makes My Day" - 4:21
"Casting a Spell" - 3:55

7" single (US promo)
"She Makes My Day" - 4:21
"She Makes My Day" - 4:21

12" single
"She Makes My Day" - 4:21
"Disturbing Behaviour" - 3:43
"Simply Irresistible (E.T. Remix)" - 6:33

CD single (UK release)
"She Makes My Day" - 4:23
"Disturbing Behaviour" - 3:45
"Simply Irresistible (E.T. Remix)" - 6:33

CD single (UK release)
"She Makes My Day" - 4:23
"Change His Ways" - 2:56

Chart performance

Personnel
 Robert Palmer - vocals, producer
 Eric "E.T." Thorngren - mixing
 David Harper - executive producer
 The Artful Dodgers Ltd - sleeve design
 Neil Matthews - photography

References

1988 songs
1988 singles
1989 singles
EMI Records singles
Robert Palmer (singer) songs
Songs written by Robert Palmer (singer)